Marian Cristian Fuchs (born 6 March 1992) is a Romanian football player who plays for Național Sebiș. He played in Liga I for Politehnica Timișoara.

A native of Moldova Nouă, Fuchs was discovered at a local youth tournament by Politehnica Timișoara manager Robert Frușa. His play as a central midfielder with the club's junior side earned the manager's comparison to Kaká.

References

External links

1992 births
Living people
Romanian footballers
FC Politehnica Timișoara players
FCV Farul Constanța players
CS Șoimii Pâncota players
Liga I players
Association football midfielders